BBC Two Northern Ireland is the Northern Irish variation of BBC Two operated by BBC Northern Ireland. It is broadcast via digital terrestrial transmitters and from the SES Astra 2E satellite (transponder 48) at the 28.2° East orbital position.

Presentation

The channel was branded onscreen as 'BBC Two NI' from October 2006 until February 2007, though not referred to as such by continuity announcers. Unique idents for Northern Ireland featuring the robotic figure 2 were used during this time, showing the Giant's Causeway and the feature eating an Ulster Fry.

Programming 
Unlike BBC Two in the rest of the UK, the channel broadcasts regular news and regional weather updates between programmes. Programmes on the service have included the following:

The Children's
First Stop
Hearts and Minds
The John Daly Show
BBC Sport NI at the Milk Cup
Sky High
Chasing the Dollar
Spotlight

Children's programmes
Sesame Tree (Originated from BBC Northern Ireland)
Pingu (Originated from the BBC)
What's New, Scooby-Doo? (US import from Cartoon Network)
Shaun the Sheep (From sister network CBBC)
Bernard (South Korea import from EBS)
Brum (Originated from the BBC)
Teletubbies (Originated from the BBC)
Arthur (US import from PBS)
The Simpsons (US import from FOX)
Charlie and Lola (From sister network CBeebies)
Barnaby Bear (Also known as Colargol)

Availability
BBC Two Northern Ireland can be seen on all television platforms on channel 2, or 102 in Northern Ireland, depending on the system and in other areas of the UK via satellite and on some other digital television platforms and in most areas of the Republic of Ireland on satellite, cable and some other digital television receivers. Programming shown on BBC Two Northern Ireland can be watched again across the UK after transmission on the BBC iPlayer service.

Until 28 October 2006, there were two separate services – 'BBC Two Northern Ireland"', an analogue-only service, referred to as "BBC Two", both in idents and continuity, and a digital-only opt-out, 'BBC Two NI', (the successor to BBC Choice Northern Ireland) which carried extra regional programming and continuity between 6pm and midnight. This has all now ended and the two Northern Ireland services have been merged.

External links

1966 establishments in Northern Ireland
BBC television channels in the United Kingdom
Television channels and stations established in 1966
Television in Northern Ireland
Television stations in Ireland
BBC Northern Ireland